Ian Kenneth Masterson is a British media composer, electronic musician and pop producer.

Biography
Since the early 1990s, he has produced and remixed songs for a range of pop acts including Dannii Minogue, Geri Halliwell, Kylie Minogue, Girls Aloud, Sheena Easton, Atomic Kitten, Bananarama, Sophie Ellis-Bextor, Lorie and the Pet Shop Boys.

Masterson has worked extensively in film and television producing score work for both the BBC and Channel 4, as well as for independent production companies. He is currently part of the production team Thriller Jill, alongside long-time friend Terry Ronald.

Filmography

Television

References

British electronic musicians
British record producers
British television composers
Record producers from Northern Ireland
Remixers
Year of birth missing (living people)
Living people
Planet Perfecto members